Happiness Begins is the fifth studio album by American pop rock band Jonas Brothers, released on June 7, 2019, by Republic Records. It is their first album since 2013's Live, and their first studio album since 2009's Lines, Vines and Trying Times. It was the first album released by the group since they reunited in 2019. It was preceded by their comeback single "Sucker" as well as "Cool". The album debuted at number one on the US Billboard 200.

Background
In writing and recording for the album, the brothers said that they wanted a "new and improved sound" with "feel-good tracks", so their A&R at Republic Records, Wendy Goldstein, got in contact with Ryan Tedder, Greg Kurstin and Justin Tranter to help compose and produce songs for them. Tedder stated that they would "write a song in about 90 minutes, [... and] cut it in the second hour. It would be demo'd by dinner." Billboard described the resulting sound as containing "hints of everything from '80s new wave to reggae to country", and also said that "Nick describes [album track] 'Hesitate' as Joe's love letter to Sophie, while 'I Believe' is a synth-heavy slow jam that alludes to his own whirlwind romance with Chopra ".

Promotion
The band announced the album in a Twitter post on April 22, 2019, sharing the cover art and release date. The brothers then separately shared the news, with Kevin stating that he was "most proud" of the album.

On April 30, the band posted teasers to social media with "Happiness Begins tomorrow". The next day, the band officially announced the Happiness Begins Tour, which began on August 7, 2019. The tour played 92 shows in North America and Europe.

Singles
On March 1, 2019, "Sucker" was released as the lead single from the album. The song debuted at number one on the Billboard Hot 100, becoming the Jonas Brothers' first song to do so. On April 5, 2019, "Cool" was released as the second single. The song debuted and peaked at number 27 on the Hot 100. "Only Human" was released as the third and last single of the album on July 2, 2019.

Commercial performance
Happiness Begins debuted at number one on the US Billboard 200 with 414,000 album-equivalent units, of which 357,000 were pure sales, becoming the Jonas Brothers' fourth number-one album in the country.

In Canada, Happiness Begins, also debuted at number one with 36,000 album-equivalent units, being the group's third chart-topping album following A Little Bit Longer and Lines, Vines and Trying Times.

Track listing

Notes
  signifies a co-producer.
  signifies a vocal producer.

Personnel
Jonas Brothers
 Joe Jonas – vocals (all tracks), background vocals (2)
 Nick Jonas – vocals (all tracks), background vocals (2), electric guitar (7), drums (11), keyboards (14)
 Kevin Jonas – background vocals (2)

Additional musicians

 Ryan Tedder – acoustic guitar (1); background vocals, bass (1, 5); drum programming (1, 5, 9), programming (1, 5, 10), electric guitar (2, 5, 9, 10), horn (10)
 Louis Bell – bass (1, 5); drum programming, programming (5)
 Homer Steinweiss – drums (1)
 Andrew DeRoberts – electric guitar (1)
 Frank Dukes – electric guitar (1)
 Casey Smith – background vocals (2, 13)
 Zach Skelton – electric guitar (2, 9, 13); bass, programming (2, 13); drums (2), drum programming (9, 13); background vocals, keyboards (13)
 Wojtek Goral – alto saxophone, flute (3)
 Shellback – background vocals, bass, keyboards, programming, tambourine (3)
 Tomas Jonsson – baritone saxophone, tenor saxophone (3)
 Mattias Bylund – bassoon, horn (3)
 Michael Engström – bass (3)
 Mia Samuelsson – flugelhorn (3)
 Nils-Petter Ankarblom – horn, horn arrangement (3)
 Jason McNab – tambourine (3)
 Jimmy Carr – tambourine (3)
 Kasper Komar – tambourine (3)
 Robert Möllard – tambourine (3)
 Peter Noos Johansson – trombone (3)
 Janne Bjerger – trombone (3)
 Magnus Johansson – trumpet (3)
 Mozella – background vocals (4)
 Greg Kurstin – bass, drums, electric guitar, synthesizer (4, 6, 7, 11); Hammond organ (6), keyboards (7, 11)
 Joel Little – bass, drums, electric guitar, programming, synthesizer (9)
 Jason Evigan – background vocals, drum programming, electric guitar (10)
 Ammar Malik – background vocals (10)
 Gian Stone – background vocals (10)
 Mike Sabath – bass, drums, electric guitar, piano, synthesizer (12)
 Brandon Collins – strings (12)
 Michael Pollack – background vocals (13)
 Ted Moock – background vocals (13)
 James Alan Ghaleb – background vocals, electric guitar (14)
 Max McElligott – bass (14)
 Simon Rossen – drums (14)
 Sylvester Siversten – drums, keyboards, programming (14)
 Andreas Lund – electric guitar (14)

Technical
 Randy Merrill – mastering
 Serban Ghenea – mixing
 John Hanes – mix engineering
 Rich Rich – engineering (2, 5, 9, 10, 13)
 Greg Kurstin – engineering (4, 6, 7, 11)
 Alex Pasco – engineering (4, 6, 7, 11)
 Julian Burg – engineering (4, 6, 7, 11)
 David Rodriguez – engineering (8)
 Joel Little – engineering (9)
 Gian Stone – engineering (10)
 Rafael Fadul – engineering (10)
 Jose Balaguer – engineering (12)
 Sylvester Siversten – engineering (14)
 Lionel Crasta – engineering assistance (10)
 Jeremy Nichols – engineering assistance (12)

Artwork
 Jacob Lerman – art direction
 Kyledidthis – art direction
 Sandy Brummels – art direction
 Jack Gorlin – photography
 Peggy Sirota – photography

Charts

Weekly charts

Year-end charts

Certifications

References

2019 albums
Jonas Brothers albums
Albums produced by Frank Dukes
Albums produced by Greg Kurstin
Albums produced by Jason Evigan
Albums produced by Joel Little
Albums produced by Louis Bell
Albums produced by Mike Elizondo
Albums produced by Ryan Tedder
Albums produced by Shellback (record producer)